Maunie is a village in White County, Illinois, United States. The population was 177 at the 2000 census.

History

The village name is a portmanteau of the first names of Maude Sheridan and Jennie Pumphrey, wives of two early settlers (John Pumphrey and G.S. Sheridan). A post office was established at Maunie in 1893.  The village incorporated in 1901.

On January 18, 1929, at 11.20 a.m., a tornado hit Maunie, killing two school children.

Geography
Maunie is located at  (38.035493, -88.046617).  The village lies in eastern Illinois along Wabash River, which marks the Illinois-Indiana state line.  

Demographics

As of the census of 2000, there were 177 people, 77 households, and 48 families residing in the village. The racial makeup of the village was 94.35% White, 1.69% African American, 1.13% Native American, 0.56% Asian, and 2.26% from two or more races. Hispanic or Latino of any race were 0.56% of the population.

There were 77 households, out of which 23.4% had children under the age of 18 living with them, 50.6% were married couples living together, 10.4% had a female householder with no husband present, and 36.4% were non-families. 31.2% of all households were made up of individuals, and 11.7% had someone living alone who was 65 years of age or older. The average household size was 2.30 and the average family size was 2.84.

In the village, the population was spread out, with 20.9% under the age of 18, 6.2% from 18 to 24, 27.7% from 25 to 44, 28.2% from 45 to 64, and 16.9% who were 65 years of age or older. The median age was 43 years. For every 100 females, there were 113.3 males. For every 100 females age 18 and over, there were 100.0 males.

The median income for a household in the village was $15,500, and the median income for a family was $19,375. Males had a median income of $22,143 versus $15,417 for females. The per capita income for the village was $10,165. About 20.4% of families and 26.0% of the population were below the poverty line, including 19.2% of those under the age of eighteen and 46.7% of those 65 or over.

References

Villages in Illinois
Villages in White County, Illinois